Thomas Wilder (born May 14, 1995) is an American basketball player for Nürnberg Falcons BC of the German ProA league.

He played college basketball the Western Michigan. He planned to participate in the 2017 NBA draft but withdrew his name and returned for his senior season. As a senior, he averaged  18.8 points, 4.3 assists, 4.4 rebounds and 1.9 steals per game.

Professional career
Prior to the 2018 NBA Draft, Wilder had workouts with several teams, Including the Sacramento Kings, Chicago Bulls,  Milwaukee Bucks, and the Charlotte Hornets. After going undrafted in the 2018 NBA Draft, Wilder was later included in the 2018 NBA Summer League roster of the Utah Jazz. He signed with for MHP Riesen Ludwigsburg of the German top tier on September 4, 2018. Wilder played two games for the German club then returned to the United States to sign a contract to play for the Windy City Bulls of the NBA G League. On January 16, 2020, Wilder recorded 16 points, five rebounds and three assists in a loss to the Lakeland Magic.

On January 3, 2021, Wilder signed with Batumi-RSU of the Georgian Superliga.

References

External links
Western Michigan Broncos bio

1995 births
Living people
American expatriate basketball people in Germany
American men's basketball players
Basketball players from Illinois
Nürnberg Falcons BC players
Riesen Ludwigsburg players
People from Montgomery, Illinois
Point guards
Sportspeople from Kane County, Illinois
Western Michigan Broncos men's basketball players
Windy City Bulls players